Evaristo Sourdis Juliao (27 March 1905 – 22 September 1970) was a lawyer and diplomat who served as 23rd Comptroller General of Colombia, from 1967–69, the sixth Permanent Representative of Colombia to the United Nations in 1953, and as Minister of Foreign Affairs of Colombia first in 1950 and again from 1953–56.

As a politician, he rose from local politics starting as Deputy to the Departmental Assembly of Atlántico, Councilman of Barranquilla, and Secretary of Government of Atlántico, and moving to the national stage first as Member of the Chamber of Representatives of Colombia for Atlántico, and then as Senator of Colombia.

His popularity, career and good bipartisan relations allowed him to run as candidate during Colombian presidential election of 1970 during the last period of the National Front that went to the Conservative party, but at the end lost to Misael Pastrana Borrero. After the election, Sourdis was named Ambassador of Colombia to Venezuela, but died before he could take up his post.

Personal life
Evaristo was born on 27 March 1905 in Sabanalarga, Atlántico to Arístides Sourdis and Raquel Henriquez Juliao Tatis, both of Sephardic Jewish descent. He studied Law in the Free University of Colombia and the Externado University between 1924 and 1929.

He married Adelaida Nájera del Castillo, and together they had three children, Adelaida, María Teresa and Evaristo.

References

Links
 Profile, uninorte.edu.co; accessed 12 March 2016.

1905 births
1970 deaths
People from Atlántico Department
Colombian Sephardi Jews
Colombian people of Jewish descent
Free University of Colombia alumni
Comptrollers General of Colombia
Members of the Chamber of Representatives of Colombia
Members of the Senate of Colombia
Foreign ministers of Colombia
Permanent Representatives of Colombia to the United Nations
Ambassadors of Colombia to the Holy See
20th-century Sephardi Jews
Grand Crosses 1st class of the Order of Merit of the Federal Republic of Germany